"Compliments on Your Kiss" is a jazz-reggae song by Jamaican deejay Red Dragon featuring Jamaican reggae duo Brian and Tony Gold. The song was written by Sly Dunbar, Winston Harris, and Red Dragon (under his real name, Leroy May), and it was produced by Sly and Robbie and Taxi. One of the song's B-sides, "Beat Up", is performed by Sly and Robbie under the name Taxi Gang.

The single was released on 18 July 1994 and became Red Dragon's most successful international hit. It peaked at number two on the UK Singles Chart on 28 August 1994 and ended the year as the 27th-most-successful single in the UK. It also experienced success outside the UK, reaching the top 20 in Australia, Ireland, the Netherlands, and New Zealand. Several reviewers have attributed the song's success to the popularity of other radio-friendly reggae musicians at the time, including Dawn Penn and Chaka Demus & Pliers.

Critical reception
In a review of the song, Music & Media magazine called "Compliments on Your Kiss" "as harmless as Puff the magic dragon" and complimented the song's Caribbean ambiance. A spokesman of British radio station Capital FM said of the song, "It's a good, fun, catchy pop tune".

Track listings
Jamaican 7-inch single
A. "Compliments on Your Kiss"
B. "Beat Up" (performed by Taxi Gang)

UK maxi-CD single
 "Compliments on Your Kiss" – 3:30	
 "Compliments on Your Kiss" (instrumental) – 4:09	
 "Compliments on Your Kiss" (Straight mix) – 4:09	
 "Compliments on Your Kiss" (acapella) – 4:09

Charts

Weekly charts

Year-end charts

Certifications

References

1994 songs
1994 singles
Island Records singles
Jamaican reggae songs
Jazz songs
Song recordings produced by Sly & Robbie